Git is the first album by Skeletons & The Girl-Faced Boys though the band had previously released material under the name "Skeletons".  It was released on Ghostly International in July 2005.

Track listing
"See the Way" – 2:45
"Git" – 2:52
"We Won't Be Proud, No No No No" – 4:30
"There's a Fly in Your Soup and I Put It There" – 4:47
"Y'all Thinks It's Soo Easy" – 1:59
"There Are Seagulls Who Live in Parking Lots" – 5:09
"You'da Been Better Off" – 5:32
"While We Were at the Movies" – 2:15
"Do You Feel Any Better?" – 8:16

2005 albums
Ghostly International albums
Skeletons (band) albums